The Vaquero's Vow is a 1908 American silent short drama film directed by D. W. Griffith.

Cast
 Charles Inslee as Renaldo
 Harry Solter as Gonzales
 Linda Arvidson
 Gladys Egan as Little Girl
 Frank Evans
 George Gebhardt as Wedding Party / Bartender
 Arthur V. Johnson as Wedding Party / In Bar
 Florence Lawrence as Wedding Party / In Bar
 Wilfred Lucas
 Jeanie MacPherson
 Mack Sennett as Wedding Party / In Bar

References

External links
 

1908 films
1908 drama films
Silent American drama films
American silent short films
American black-and-white films
Films directed by D. W. Griffith
1908 short films
1900s American films